Worksop South East is an electoral ward in the district of Bassetlaw. The ward elects 3 councillors to Bassetlaw District Council using the first past the post electoral system, with each councillor serving a four-year term in office. The number of registered voters in the ward is 5,636 as of 2019.

It consists of the southeastern part of Worksop, including the former pit village of Manton.

The ward was created in 2002 following a review of electoral boundaries in Bassetlaw by the Boundary Committee for England.

Councillors

The ward elects 3 councillors every four years. Prior to 2015, Bassetlaw District Council was elected by thirds with elections taking place every year except the year in which elections to Nottinghamshire County Council took place.

Elections

2019

† Colin Barton was expelled from the Conservative Party in April 2019, however he remained a nominated Conservative candidate in this election as the deadline for withdrawals had passed.

2018 by-election
A by-election was held on 22 March 2018 due to the resignation of Deirdre Foley (Labour).

2015

2014

2012

2011

2010

2008

2007

2006

2004

2003

2002

References

Wards of Nottinghamshire